Cymbastela stipitata is a species of marine sponge in the family Axinellidae.

The sponge was first described in 1967 by Patricia Bergquist and Catherine Tizard as Pseudaxinyssa stipitata, but was assigned to the new genus, Cymbastela, in 1992 by John Hooper and Patricia Bergquist.

It is found in Australia's coastal waters, from the Gulf of Carpentaria to the north west coasts of Western Australia. It is a sessile filter-feeder, found generally in intertidal waters on coral reefs at depths up to 19 m.

References

External links
Distribution of Cymbastela stipitat

Axinellidae
Taxa named by Patricia Bergquist